Count Maximilian Maria Karl Desiderius de Garnerin de la Thuile von Montgelas (23 May 1860 Saint Petersburg – 4 February 1938 Munich) was a Bavarian general and diplomat.

Biography
The grandson of Maximilian von Montgelas, he joined the army in 1879, served in the Boxer Expedition and was military attaché in Peking from 1901 to 1902.  In 1914, during the early phase of World War I, he commanded the 4th Bavarian Infantry Division but retired the following year to devote himself to careful study of the matters relating to the outbreak of the war and responsibility for it.  In that capacity, he was official adviser to the Reichstag Committee of Enquiry.

He was married to Countess Pauline von Wimpffen.

He was a German count and the official spokesman for the German Weimar Republic at the Paris Peace Conference following World War I to investigate the question of responsibility for the war. He helped to draft the German answer to the charges of war guilt and was one of the four signatories to the Memorandum, presented in May 1919, in reply to the Western Allies. Later, in the absence of the other members of the German Commission, he was jointly responsible, with Delbruck, for a further Memorandum replying to the Allied Note of 16 June.

He subsequently wrote his controversial book The Case for the Central Powers: An Impeachment of the Versailles Verdict, published in London by George, Allen & Unwin Ltd., in 1925. The previous year he and Professor Walther Schücking had edited The Outbreak of the World War - German Documents collected by Karl Kautsky, commonly known as the Kautsky Documents, which were published by the Oxford University Press.

See also
 Article 231
 War guilt question

References

External links
 

German politicians
German military personnel of the Boxer Rebellion
Bavarian generals
German diplomats
Counts of Germany
Burials at the Alter Nordfriedhof (Munich)
1860 births
1939 deaths
German Army generals of World War I
De Garnerin von Montgelas